The Metropolitan Railway H Class consisted of eight 4-4-4T steam locomotives, numbered 103 to 110. They were built by Kerr, Stuart & Co of Stoke on Trent in 1920 at a cost of £11,575 each.

Overview
They were designed by The Met's Locomotive & Chief Electrical Engineer, Charles Jones. Delivered between October 1920 and June 1921, they allowed for the retirement of a like number of 0-4-4T C Class and 2-4-0T D Class locomotives. The H Class were considered to be good engines well-suited to the express trains they worked, allowing for a reduction in running times of  up to six minutes.

Transfer to LNER
When the steam-hauled services were transferred from London Transport to the London and North Eastern Railway in 1937, all eight H Class locomotives were included to continue working the same trains. The LNER numbered them 6415–6422 and classified them as H2 Class. In the 1940s, they were moved from Neasden (LNER) shed to the Nottingham area and worked over other parts of the former Great Central Railway system.

Withdrawal
All were withdrawn and scrapped between 1942 and 1947.

References

External links 
 http://www.lner.info/locos/H/h2.shtml

H
4-4-4T locomotives
Kerr Stuart locomotives
Railway locomotives introduced in 1920
Scrapped locomotives
Standard gauge steam locomotives of Great Britain

Passenger locomotives